is a Japanese politician of the Democratic Party for the People, a member of the House of Representatives in the Diet (national legislature). A native of Kitamoto, Saitama and graduate of Waseda University, he was elected for the first time in 2000.

References

External links 
 Official website in Japanese.

1956 births
Living people
Politicians from Saitama Prefecture
Waseda University alumni
Members of the House of Representatives (Japan)
Democratic Party of Japan politicians
21st-century Japanese politicians